The Military Merit Order (Militärverdienstorden) was a military order of the Kingdom of Württemberg, which joined the German Empire in 1871. The order was one of the older military orders of the states of the German Empire. It was founded on 11 February 1759 by Karl Eugen, Duke of Württemberg as the Militär-Carls-Orden, and was renamed the Militärverdienstorden on 11 November 1806 by King Friedrich I. The order underwent several more revisions over the course of the 19th and early 20th centuries.  It became obsolete with the fall of the Württemberg monarchy in the wake of Germany's defeat in World War I.

Classes
The order came in three classes: 
 Grand Cross (Großkreuz) 
 Commander's Cross (Kommandeurkreuz) and 
 Knight's Cross (Ritterkreuz).

Generally, the rank of the recipient determined which grade he would receive. Between 1799 and 1919, there were an estimated 95 awards of the Grand Cross, 214 of the Commander's Cross, and 3,128 of the Knight's Cross, with the bulk of these awards made in World War I; the numbers may only cover native Württembergers.

Description
The badge of the order was a white-enameled gold cross pattée with curved arms and slightly concave edges.  Around the white-enameled center medallion was a blue-enameled gold ring bearing on both sides the motto "Furchtlos und trew" ("Fearless and loyal"). On the obverse, the medallion bore a green-enameled gold laurel wreath.  On the reverse, the medallion bore the monogram of the king of Württemberg at the time of award. The cross was the same size for the Grand Cross and the Commander's Cross, and slightly smaller for the Knight's Cross. The Grand Cross and Commander's Cross, and from 1870 the Knight's Cross, were topped with a crown. On 25 September 1914, the crown was removed from all grades.

The star of the order, awarded with the Grand Cross only, was a gold-rimmed silver eight-pointed star featuring the ringed medallion of the obverse of the cross.

The ribbon of the order was, until 1818 and after 1914, yellow with broad black stripes near each edge. After November 1917, when the ribbon was worn without the medal, the ribbon bore a green-enameled wreath to distinguish it from other Württemberg decorations on the same ribbon. The ribbon from 1818 to 1914 was blue.

Notable recipients

Grand Crosses 

 Duke Adam of Württemberg
 Albert of Saxony
 Albrecht, Duke of Württemberg
 Prince August of Württemberg
 Gebhard Leberecht von Blücher
 Leonhard Graf von Blumenthal
 Jérôme Bonaparte
 Julius von Bose
 Carl, Duke of Württemberg
 Prince Charles of Prussia
 Archduke Eugen of Austria
 Duke Eugen of Württemberg (1758–1822)
 Ferdinand I of Bulgaria
 Frederic von Franquemont
 Eduard von Fransecky
 Frederick Francis II, Grand Duke of Mecklenburg-Schwerin
 Frederick III, German Emperor
 Prince Friedrich Karl of Prussia (1828–1885)
 Prince Friedrich Leopold of Prussia
 Archduke Friedrich, Duke of Teschen
 George, King of Saxony
 Paul von Hindenburg
 Archduke John of Austria
 Georg von Kameke
 Hugo von Kirchbach
 Grand Duke Konstantin Pavlovich of Russia
 Duke Louis of Württemberg
 Ludwig III of Bavaria
 Edwin Freiherr von Manteuffel
 Jean Gabriel Marchand
 Grand Duke Michael Nikolaevich of Russia
 Helmuth von Moltke the Elder
 Nicholas I of Russia
 Grand Duke Nicholas Nikolaevich of Russia (1831–1891)
 Ivan Paskevich
 Philipp Albrecht, Duke of Württemberg
 Joseph Radetzky von Radetz
 Albrecht von Roon
 Rupprecht, Crown Prince of Bavaria
 Alfred von Schlieffen
 Albrecht von Stosch
 Wilhelm von Tümpling
 Nikita Volkonsky
 Alfred von Waldersee
 Arthur Wellesley, 1st Duke of Wellington
 August von Werder
 Wilhelm II, German Emperor
 William I of Württemberg
 William I, German Emperor
 William II of the Netherlands
 Duke William Frederick Philip of Württemberg
 Duke William of Württemberg
 Duke Eugen of Württemberg (1788–1857)
 Duke Ferdinand Frederick Augustus of Württemberg
 Ferdinand von Zeppelin
 Otto von Marchtaler

Commanders 

 Duke Alexander of Württemberg (1771–1833)
 Paul Bronsart von Schellendorff
 Max von Fabeck
 Friedrich Wilhelm von Bismarck
 Franz von Hipper
 Julius von Verdy du Vernois
 Wilhelm Karl, Duke of Urach

Knights 

 Alexander II of Russia
 Gottlob Berger
 Oswald Boelcke
 Walter Braemer
 Wladyslaw Grzegorz Branicki
 Nikolaus zu Dohna-Schlodien
 Ernst I, Prince of Hohenlohe-Langenburg
 Friedrich Ehmann
 Gottfried Ehmann
 Otto Esswein
 Wilhelm Groener
 Philip, Landgrave of Hesse-Homburg
 Erich Ludendorff
 Max Ritter von Müller
 Karl August Nerger
 Grand Duke Nicholas Konstantinovich of Russia
 Prince Paul of Württemberg
 Manfred von Richthofen
 Erwin Rommel
 Reinhard Scheer
 Hugo Sperrle
 Jona von Ustinov
 Otto Weddigen
 William II of Württemberg
 Franz Graf von Wimpffen
 Duke Eugen of Württemberg (1846–1877)

References 

 Königlich Statistischer Landesamt,Hof und Staatshandbuch des Königreichs Württemberg, 1908.
 Neal O'Connor, Aviation Awards of Imperial Germany in World War I and the Men Who Earned Them: Volume IV - The Aviation Awards of the Kingdom of Württemberg, Flying Machines Press 1995
 Dr. Kurt-Gerhard Klietmann, Pour le Mérite und Tapferkeitsmedaille, 1966.
 Website on the Decorations of the Kingdom of Württemberg

Notes 

Orders, decorations, and medals of Württemberg
Military awards and decorations of Imperial Germany
1759 establishments in the Holy Roman Empire
1919 disestablishments in Germany
Awards established in 1759
Awards disestablished in 1919